Harry Pollak, born as Jindřich Pollak (1923, in Semtín near Votice, Czechoslovakia – 2014, in Netstal, Switzerland), was a Czech mechanical engineer and economist of Jewish origin. He left then-Czechoslovakia at 25 and spent most of his life in England, eventually becoming a financial consultant. He was part of the team that helped rescue British car maker Aston Martin from bankruptcy. He worked for IBM, Krupp, and Dunlop. The companies he financially saved also included a Swiss paper mill, a number of heavy manufacturers, and the largest European producer of printed circuit boards.

Life
Harry Pollak was born as the only child to a family of landowners in South Bohemia. He was able to escape the Holocaust only because his parents sent him to study at a lyceum in Nîmes in 1938. When he was 17, he joined the allied forces in France. He fought against the Nazis during World War II, and was one of the Czech soldiers who laid siege to the German-held city of Dunkirk in September 1944. He returned to Czechoslovakia with the Western Allies in May 1945.

After the war, he was proclaimed German and a Nazi collaborator, and the authorities in Votice withheld his family farmland for three years. Before the Communist Coup in 1948, he was denied his master's degree from the Czech Technical University in Prague. Following the Communist Coup, his inherited property, which had been returned to him by a court decision, was permanently confiscated. In 1949, he and his wife Jarmila managed to escape over the Šumava Mountains into West Germany. Later, they continued on to Great Britain where they received asylum and Harry finished his studies. They had a son named René Thomas.

In 2003, he received a PhD in Business Administration from the University of Economics in Prague. In 2016, the Centre for Restructuring and Insolvency at the University of Economics was named after Pollak, acknowledging his achievements in the field of restructuring businesses.

For most of his career, Pollak worked as a crisis manager in various countries. Apart from the UK, he was employed in Germany, Italy, and the US, and he finally settled in Netstal in Switzerland, where he died at the age of 91.

Professional career

Three months after having escaped to England from the Communist regime, Pollak got his first job. On May 2, 1950, he started working as an engineer with Carrier Engineering Co. Ltd. at a weekly wage of £9. He received much more responsibility and a higher salary as a project engineer at Brightside Foundry. Shortly after that, he accepted a job on Northumberland Avenue, which was a disappointment for him.

He became an associate member of the Institution of Heating and Ventilating Engineers and was contracted to lead Arcon, an American air conditioning company, in England. Pollak recalled this job as a milestone in his career. He also developed an effective refrigerated truck for Express Dairy and was eventually named general manager of Westair, a division of Westool.

Pollak became a member of the Institution of Mechanical Engineers, but he was no longer fully satisfied with working in this field, so he decided to focus on business consulting. In February 1961, he started implementing the US Value Analysis system at the Zurich branch of Mead Carney & Co. He also worked in Germany for companies like Auto Union, IBM, Krupp-Ardelt, and Bargedorfer Eisenwerk. In the UK, he worked with Sturtevant Engineering, followed by MEM, a producer of electric switches, a producer of motors for home appliances (AEI), and in the transformers division of English Electric. He applied for a third week of unpaid leave at English Electric to travel to Canada, but was denied, so he decided to hand in his notice and go on holiday.

Upon his return from Canada in 1966, he already had a contract as a senior consultant with Dunlop, a company with 105,000 employees worldwide, where he implemented Value Analysis and solved corporate problems.

After that, he accepted a job with a newly established company, Keyser Ullmann Industries, which was engaged in restructuring businesses for its mother bank. Pollak’s first assignment was with Hallam Sleigh & Cheston Ltd. He was installed there as a member of the Board of Directors in order to restructure the company from scratch and rescue it from bankruptcy. His other contractors included the market research company (KBMS) and Negretti & Zamba, a manufacturer of precision products for the aircraft industry.

Keyser Ullmann Industries at that time preferred faster profits from real property business rather than the time-consuming restructuring of companies. The bank’s funds were becoming less and less accessible for Pollak and his team. Moreover, due to the subsequent real property crisis, the bank went bankrupt. In 1972, Pollak decided to become a freelance expert.

Freelance career

Pollak’s first private client was the company Hallam Sleigh & Chestorn Ltd., with whom he had already cooperated as a Keyser Ullmann Industries employee. He planned to prepare the company for the downturn in the car industry. Though he managed to restructure it so well that he received an award by the London Stock Exchange, his contract was terminated by the managing director, Peter Cheston, who argued that the employees were not happy with the changes.

After having tested new opportunities for several months, he was hired as a director of a new firm Company Development (London) Ltd. which had been established by a group of lawyers, investors, and accountants. Their first contract was to restructure a manufacturer of silver, John Betts & Sons. By transferring the manufacturing component from the centre of Birmingham to its outskirts, and then selling the piece of land and reinvesting the proceeds, the company was rescued.

Probably best known was Pollak’s participation in restructuring Aston Martin, a car manufacturer. The owner, Sir David Brown, had not made a single pound of profit and was ready to sell it. Company Development (London) Ltd. purchased it but the employees of Aston Martin went on strike after the sale. However, they returned to work after two days when Pollak negotiated an agreement that would prevent further strikes with the leaders of the three trade unions operating its manufacturing. He put the car maker back on its feet — it has been successful to date.

Pollak did not part on good terms with Company Development (London) Ltd. When the family firm John Betts & Sons started doing well and Pollak wanted to keep the promise and pay the family a share of the profits, his other two partners and directors opposed it. As a result, he terminated his contract with Company Development (London) Ltd. in 1973, together with his engagement in John Betts & Sons and Aston Martin.

After having left Company Development (London) Ltd., Pollak consulted for several companies until his retirement, including paper manufacturer Thomas & Green Ltd., Eschler Urania, a distributor of car engine parts, Zbinden & Co. a manufacturer of printed circuit boards, Ulrich Steinemann, a producer of wooden boards, and banking company W. Wenk.

In 1986 Pollak retired. He was living in Switzerland but was going to the University of Economics, Prague to lecture. In 2003 he obtained a doctorate from the university.

Published texts
In the 2000s three books were published in the Czech Republic:
 Jak obnovit životaschopnost upadajících podniků,  (How To Rescue Bankrupting Companies)
 Jak odstranit neopodstatněné náklady: hodnotová analýza v praxi,  (Eliminating Unjustified Costs: Value Analysis in Practice)
 Můj život: Harry Pollak – muž, který zachránil značku Aston Martin,  (My Life: Harry Pollak – the Man Who Rescued Aston Martin).

References

Interviews with Harry Pollak 
 Němci byli nepřátelé, zrada Čechů mě bolí víc, říká židovský emigrant Harry Pollak, 18. 11. 2010, xman.cz 
 Harry Pollak: Muž, který zachránil Aston Martin, 15. 1. 2011, Czech Radio, Radio Prague 
 Harry Pollak: Od nucené emigrace až po doktora Ph.D., 12. 6. 2012, University of Economics in Prague 
 Harry Pollak, recorded in 2013 and edited in January 2014 by Luděk Jirka, Paměť národa 
 Harry Pollak: Můj život, 17. 6. 2015, Czech Radio, Vltava 

1923 births
2014 deaths
Czechoslovak economists
Czech engineers
Czech people of Jewish descent
Czechoslovak emigrants to the United Kingdom
French military personnel of World War II